Tore Thorvaldsen Sandbakken (born 14 May 1985 in Trondheim, Norway) is a Norwegian jazz musician (drums) and composer, living in Oslo, and known from collaborations in a number of bands, ranging from free improvised music to modern jazz.

Career 
Sandbakken holds a Master's degree in drumming and improvisation from the Norwegian Academy of Music in Oslo, and the Rhythmic Music Conservatory in Copenhagen, with guidance from musicians such as Thomas Strønen, Tor Haugerud, Pål Thowsen, Kresten Osgood and Jonas Johansen. He has played in several bands like Aphrodisiac, Off Topic, Vojtech Prochazka Trio, Jens Carelius and Astrid E. Pedersen Ensemble. Together with Kim Johannesen and Svein Magnus Furu he was nominated for Spellemannprisen 2009, in the class Jazz for the album Kayak.

Discography 

2009: The Beat of The Travel (Viking Records), with Jens Carelius
2009: Kayak (AIM Sound City), with Kim Johannesen & Svein Magnus Furu
2009: Sacred Harp (The Perfect Hoax), with Sacred Harp
2010: Amoeba's Dance (Animal Music), with Vojtech Prochazka Trio
2010: Yearning (Park Grammofon), with Aphrodisiac
2011: The Architect (Jansen Plateproduksjon), with Jens Carelius
2012: Først (NorCD), with Dag-Filip Roaldsnes
2012: Dark Poetry (Creative Sources), within Bleak House
2013: Salmer og jazz, with Eli Helland
2013: Hot Music (Leo Records), with Arrigo Cappelletti 4tet
2013: A Tribute to Jack Teagarden (Herman Records), with Kristoffer Kompen
2013: Solen avløser regnet som avløser solen' (Sofa Records), with Bergljot
2013: The Island'' (Impeller Records), with Ine Hoem

References

External links 

21st-century Norwegian drummers
Norwegian jazz drummers
Male drummers
Norwegian percussionists
Norwegian jazz composers
Norwegian Academy of Music alumni
1985 births
Living people
Musicians from Trondheim
Male jazz composers
21st-century Norwegian male musicians